Iran participated in the 2010 Winter Olympics in Vancouver, British Columbia, Canada. Four athletes represented Iran in the 2010 Olympics, three in alpine skiing and one in cross-country skiing. Marjan Kalhor was the first woman to represent Iran at the Winter Olympics.

Background

Iran has not won a medal at the Winter Olympics.

Results by event

Skiing

Alpine

Men

Women

Cross-country

Men

References

External links
 Official Website

2010 in Iranian sport
Nations at the 2010 Winter Olympics
2010